The Contract is a 2006 German-American action thriller film directed by Bruce Beresford and written by television writer Stephen Katz and John Darrouzet. The Contract stars Morgan Freeman as professional assassin Frank Carden and John Cusack as a teacher who gets entangled into his latest assignment during a camp trip with his son. Released direct to video in the United States and most of Europe, The Contract received little critical notice despite its high-profile cast.

Plot
Frank Carden (Morgan Freeman) is a professional assassin who has been hired to kill a reclusive billionaire named Lydell Hammond, Sr., a vocal opponent of stem cell research. Carden's plan goes awry when he gets injured in a car accident and ends up in the hospital. When hospital staff see his gun, they call the police. They are able to peel away his false identity and federal marshals are called in to pick him up. Widower Ray Keene (John Cusack), a high school gym teacher, ex-cop and well-intentioned but not very able dad to Chris (Jamie Anderson), belatedly realizes the need to bond with his son when the latter gets caught smoking marijuana and takes him hiking in the wilderness. Carden is being driven through that same wilderness by the marshals but his men stage a rescue attempt. The car is crashed and most of the marshals end up dead. The surviving marshal asks Keene to take the prisoner to the authorities and then dies of his injuries. Ray and Chris have to get Carden out of the wilderness and hand him over to the authorities. Carden's men, highly skilled ex-military thugs, track them down to rescue Carden and kill the Keenes.  The pursuit brings a couple, Sandra and Lochlan (Megan Dodds and Ryan McCluskey) into the crossfire, with Lochlan being killed by Carden's men.  In a tense standoff in a cabin in the woods, Carden's friends turn up and Keene agrees to let Carden go. Just at that moment, one of Carden's thugs bursts in and punches Chris, causing Keene to panic and kill him, while Sandra shoots the other as he enters firing. Carden escapes, taking Chris as a hostage, while Sandra and Keene are rescued by the local police. Miles (Alice Krige), Carden's mission handler, tells Davis (Corey Johnson), Carden's recent recruit, to kill Carden and Chris and to make it look like Carden did it. She also tells him to kill Keene in case Carden told him anything about his job. Feeling defeated and resting at home, a televised news report echoes an earlier conversation about Carden's job description with the key phrase "exterminating obstacles to progress" which makes Keene aware of Carden's intended target. Keene heads to the funeral of Hammond, Jr., to intercept Carden inadvertently saving Carden from Davis. Carden gets the upper hand on Davis, killing him with his own sniper rifle. However, the battle forces Carden to miss his own window of opportunity to assassinate Hammond, Sr. Carden relents in giving Keene a set of keys to a hotel room where Carden locked up Chris, letting father and son reunite while he disappears. In Washington, D.C., Carden intercepts Miles, aware of her role in hiring Davis to kill him. Carden threatens to "come after her" if any harm were to come to the Keene family. Two weeks after the incident, Keene enters into a relationship with Sandra and holds a family barbecue, expressing disbelief in hearing a radio news report about Hammond, Sr., dying in a "boating accident", realizing that Carden finished his contract killing.

Cast
 Morgan Freeman as Frank Carden
 John Cusack as Ray Keene
 Jamie Anderson as Chris Keene
 Bill Smitrovich as Chief Ed Wainwright
 Ned Bellamy as Deputy Evans
 Megan Dodds as Sandra
 Jonathan Hyde as Turner
 Corey Johnson as Davis
 Alice Krige as Miles
 Ian Shaw as Michaels
 Jonas Talkington as Paramedic
 Ryan Spike Dauner as Helicopter Pilot #1
 Mike Diamente as Agent Reyes
 Atanas Srebrev as Agent Rodriguez
 Maynard Eziashi as Agent Chuck Robbins

Production
Director Bruce Beresford talks extensively about the production of the movie in his memoir Josh Hartnett Definitely Wants To do This... True Stories From A Life In The Screen Trade.

The film was shot almost exclusively in Bulgaria and the DSK Bank central headquarters served as one of the main sets.

The scenes on the large rock were filmed at the Zlatnite Mostove on the Vitosha Mountain by Sofia, the capital city of Bulgaria.

Reception
The film received negative reviews. It has a 0% rating on Rotten Tomatoes from 6 critics who reviewed it. Leonard Maltin awarded the film two stars.

References

External links
 
  
 
 The Contract Review

2006 films
Nu Image films
2006 crime thriller films
Films directed by Bruce Beresford
Films shot in Bulgaria
Films scored by Normand Corbeil
MoviePass Films films
2000s English-language films